Streptomyces populi is an endophytic bacterium species from the genus of Streptomyces which has been isolated from the stem of the tree Populus adenopoda from the Mount Qingcheng in China.

See also 
 List of Streptomyces species

References 

populi
Bacteria described in 2018